Delta Trestle Bridge, Maryland and Pennsylvania Railroad is a historic wooden trestle railroad bridge in Peach Bottom Township, York County, Pennsylvania.  It was built about 1875, and measures about  overall. It was built by the Maryland and Pennsylvania Railroad to connect two rises of land divided by a ravine.  It is one of only two trestle bridges to remain from the original railroad, the other being the Taylor trestle, in York Township, PA, between Red Lion, PA and Dallastown, PA.

It was added to the National Register of Historic Places in 1995.

References

Railroad bridges on the National Register of Historic Places in Pennsylvania
Bridges completed in 1875
Bridges in York County, Pennsylvania
National Register of Historic Places in York County, Pennsylvania
Trestle bridges in the United States